Kevin Geyer (born 11 October 1973) is an Australian former cricketer. He played three first-class and six List A matches for New South Wales between 1997/98 and 1998/99.

See also
 List of New South Wales representative cricketers

References

External links
 

1973 births
Living people
Australian cricketers
New South Wales cricketers
People from Bathurst, New South Wales
Cricketers from New South Wales